The Canons of Edgar are a set of early eleventh-century ecclesiastical regulations produced in Anglo-Saxon England by Wulfstan, Archbishop of York.

According to Fowler, the Canons of Edgar "was central in Wulfstan's programme of reform; it also demonstrates better than  any other of his works the deliberateness with which he familiarized himself with the best canonical writings to provide a basis of accepted authority for [these] reforms."

Manuscripts

One version of the Canons — labelled version "D" — can be found in an eleventh-century manuscript, Corpus Christi College, Cambridge MS. 201, where it has been copied out by hand on pages 97 to 101.

Editions and translations

Fowler, Roger (1972). Wulfstan's Canons of Edgar. London: Oxford University Press.
Translation: Andrew Rabin, The Political Writings of Archbishop Wulfstan of York (Manchester, 2015), pp. 85-100

References 

 

Old English literature